Peter Wayner is an American writer known for his books on technology and his writing in mainstream publications including The New York Times, InfoWorld, and Wired magazine. His work on mimic functions, a camouflaging technique for encoding data so it takes on the statistical characteristics of other information, is an example of  steganography. This work formed the seed for his book, Disappearing Cryptography, one of the earliest to explore how information can be camouflaged through algorithms to appear to be another form. His book, Policing Online Games, was cited by Craig Steven Wright as one of the earliest explanations and inspirations for decentralized currency systems like Bitcoin.

In 2018, he received attention for writing an article about the New York City transit system, advocating for replacing large subway trains with competing fleets of smaller, thinner and more nimble autonomous cars, scooters, hoverboards and pods. The article received widespread criticism.

Bibliography (selected)

References 

Living people
Technology writers
Year of birth missing (living people)
Steganography
Cypherpunks